Øyvind Alseth (born 13 August 1994) is a Norwegian footballer who currently plays as a defender or midfielder.

Career

College
Alseth played four years of college soccer at the Syracuse University between 2013 and 2016. While at college, Alseth appeared for USL PDL side K-W United.

Professional
Alseth was selected in the third round (65th overall) of the 2017 MLS SuperDraft by Toronto FC. Alseth signed with Toronto on 22 March 2017.

Alseth made his professional debut on 25 March 2017, starting for Toronto's United Soccer League affiliate team against Phoenix Rising FC.

Career statistics

References

External links

 
 
 Øyvind Alseth at Syracuse University Athletics
 

1994 births
Living people
Footballers from Trondheim
Norwegian footballers
Norwegian expatriate footballers
Syracuse Orange men's soccer players
K-W United FC players
Toronto FC players
Toronto FC II players
Ranheim Fotball players
Expatriate soccer players in Canada
USL League Two players
Major League Soccer players
USL Championship players
Toronto FC draft picks
Eliteserien players
Norwegian First Division players
Norwegian expatriate sportspeople in Canada
Norwegian expatriate sportspeople in the United States
Association football midfielders
Association football defenders